Hatay Dumlupınarspor is a women's football club located in İskenderun near Hatay, southern Turkey. The team competes in Turkish Women's Third Football League.

Statistics

Notes:
1) Three penalty points  were deducted by the Turkish Football Federation (TFF)
2)  Three penalty points  were deducted by the TFF
3)  Six penalty points  were deducted by the TFF

References

External links 
Hatay Dumlupınarspor on TFF.org

Football clubs in Hatay
Women's football clubs in Turkey
İskenderun District